General James Blair  (27 January 1828 – 18 January 1905) was a Scottish recipient of the Victoria Cross (VC), the highest and most prestigious award for gallantry in the face of the enemy that can be awarded to members of British and Commonwealth forces.

Blair was born in Neemuch, Gwalior State in India, the son of a captain in the Bengal Cavalry. He was commissioned into the 2nd Bombay Light Cavalry, Bombay Army in 1844, becoming a Lieutenant in 1848.

He was 29 years old, and a captain in the 2nd Bombay Light Cavalry during the Indian Mutiny when the following deeds took place for which he was awarded the VC.

Blair served until the end of the Indian Mutiny, mainly in Central India, including the pursuit of Tatya Tope.

Continuing to serve in the Indian Army, Blair acted as Political Resident at Aden between 1882–85 with the rank of brigadier-general. He was promoted major-general 1885, and in 1889 became a lieutenant-general and was appointed a companion of the Order of the Bath. He was placed on the unemployed supernumerary list in 1890. In retirement he was promoted general in 1894 and appointed colonel of the 32nd Lancers in 1904. 

Blair died at his home in Melrose Roxburghshire in January 1905, age of 76 and was buried at Trinity Churchyard, Melrose.

He was the cousin of Captain Robert Blair, who also won the VC in the Indian Mutiny.

References

Location of grave and VC medal (Border, Scotland)

1828 births
1905 deaths
British recipients of the Victoria Cross
Indian Rebellion of 1857 recipients of the Victoria Cross
British Indian Army generals
British East India Company Army officers
People from Neemuch
Companions of the Order of the Bath
British colonial governors and administrators in Asia
Military personnel of British India